Jonathan Davis (born 17 February 1954) is a British author, editor and journalist specialising in finance.

Educated at Winchester College and Cambridge University where he gained a master's degree in history, he became a senior business journalist at The Sunday Telegraph, The Times and The Economist before taking a master's degree in Management at the MIT Sloan School of Management where, in preparation for his thesis, he met and studied the methods of investor Warren Buffett. 

From 1995 to 2007 he wrote a weekly column in The Independent and. from 2006 to 2009. wrote a fortnightly column in the Financial Times. 

As of 2009' he writes a blog at Independent Investor, which he founded, and is investment director of Agrifirma, a specialist investment management company headed by investor Jim Slater, and since 2002 is chairman of the Savile Club in London.

Bibliography
Investing with Anthony Bolton 
What Warren Buffett Thinks 2006
What Warren Buffett Thinks 2005
Money Makers

References

External links
The Spectator - Jonathan Davis
The Financial Times - FTfm - Last Word

1954 births
British writers
British male journalists
Living people
People educated at Winchester College
Alumni of Gonville and Caius College, Cambridge
MIT Sloan School of Management alumni